Guangxi Bailong Nuclear Power Project is a nuclear power plant proposed in Fangchenggang, near Bailong Village ( 白龙村 ), autonomous region of Guangxi (Guangxi Zhuang Autonomous Region) in China. A total of six reactors are planned to operate at the Bailong site. Units 1 and 2 are both CAP1000s, units 3–6 are planned to be based on CAP1400 reactors.

The signing ceremony for the construction of the first phase was held in Nanning in July 2006 with construction to commence in 2008.

Latest report indicates that reactor 1 will start construction on 12/30/21, with reactor 2 starting construction 10 months later.  Reactor 1 is scheduled to be commissioned by August 2026, while reactor 2 will be commissioned by June 2027.  Total project cost will be 390 billion yuan, or about $61.1 billion at current exchange rate (Oct 2021).

Reactor data
The Guangxi Bailong Nuclear Power Plant consist of 2 reactors under construction, and 4 reactors planned.

See also

Generation III reactor

References

Nuclear power stations in China
Buildings and structures in Guangxi
2015 establishments in China
Buildings and structures under construction in China
Nuclear power stations with reactors under construction